Rubén Váldez (15 May 1923 – 5 June 2008) was a Peruvian sports shooter. He competed at the 1956 Summer Olympics and the 1960 Summer Olympics.

References

1923 births
2008 deaths
Peruvian male sport shooters
Olympic shooters of Peru
Shooters at the 1956 Summer Olympics
Shooters at the 1960 Summer Olympics
People from Arequipa
Pan American Games medalists in shooting
Pan American Games silver medalists for Peru
Pan American Games bronze medalists for Peru
Shooters at the 1951 Pan American Games
Medalists at the 1951 Pan American Games
20th-century Peruvian people
21st-century Peruvian people